The Desert de les Palmes Nature Reserve (Spanish: Parque Natural del Desierto de Las Palmas, Valencian: Desert de les Palmes) is a nature preserve in the province of Castellón, in the Valencian Community, Spain.

Basic information 
The 3,293 hectare area was declared a nature preserve by the valencian government on October 16, 1989. The area burned on numerous occasions in 1985 and 1992, which is why there is little wild forest there. The name of the preserve comes from the historical presence of a religious order of Carmelita Mendicants. This order calls spaces that are dedicated to spiritual retreat "holy deserts" (los "Santos Desiertos"). The second part of the name comes from the abundance of palms (Chamaerops humilis) in the area. Chamaerops are the only palm endemic to Europe.

Municipalities 
 Benicàssim
 Borriol
 Cabanes
 Castellón de la Plana
 La Pobla Tornesa

Image gallery

References 

1989 establishments in Spain
Natural parks of the Valencian Community